George Frederick Roberts (2 February 1913 – 22 July 1962) was an Australian politician who was a Liberal Party member of the Legislative Assembly of Western Australia from 1955 until his death, representing the seat of Bunbury.

Roberts was born in Bunbury, and attended Bunbury High School. After leaving school, he worked as a livestock auctioneer. He enlisted in the Australian Army in November 1939, and served as a lieutenant with the 2/11th and 2/33rd Battalions in Europe. After being discharged in 1944, Roberts returned to Bunbury, where he became the managing director of a local department store, Haywards. A founding member of the Liberal Party, he was elected to parliament at the 1955 Bunbury by-election, caused by the death of the sitting Labor member, Frank Guthrie. He was re-elected three times (in 1956, 1959 and 1962), but, like his predecessor, died in office. George Roberts had married Dorothy Harriet Christey in 1951, with whom he had three children, Kim, Helen & Ian Roberts.

References

1913 births
1962 deaths
Australian Army officers
Australian Army personnel of World War II
Liberal Party of Australia members of the Parliament of Western Australia
Members of the Western Australian Legislative Assembly
People from Bunbury, Western Australia
20th-century Australian politicians